The Government Model Senior Secondary School Junga, was established in 1929, in Junga, Shimla District, Himachal Pradesh. It is a Co-educational, English and Hindi Medium government school affiliated to the Himachal Pradesh Board of School Education Dharamshala, from elementary (6th Grade) up to the senior secondary levels (12th Grade).

The school was accredited 'Model School' by Education Department Government of Himachal Pradesh in April, 2017.

References

Schools in Shimla district